St. Joseph Transit provides local public transportation, as a division of the Public Works and Transportation Department of the City of St. Joseph in Buchanan County, Missouri. Eight routes, operating under the brand "The Ride", provide regular Monday through Saturday service. On August 15, 2022, St. Joseph Transit launched a route redesign, which led to routes being serviced by buses every 30 minutes, rather than 45 under the previous system. However, the number of routes went from 12 under the old system, to 8 under the new design.

Facilities

Administration
Address: 702 South 5th St.
Coordinates: 
Facilities: Administration and fleet maintenance

Transit Center
Address: 611 Angelique St.
Coordinates: 
Facilities: Waiting area, ticket booth, bus connections

Routes
"The Ride" has eight regularly scheduled routes originating at the downtown transit center. The transit center is also serviced by Jefferson Lines, providing connections to destinations throughout the central states.

References

External Links
Transit 

Bus transportation in Missouri
Transit